Catherine of Habsburg or Catherine of Austria may refer to:

 Catherine of Habsburg (1256–1282), daughter of Rudolf I of Germany and wife of Otto III, Duke of Bavaria
 Catherine of Austria, Duchess of Calabria (1295–1323), daughter of Albert I, Duke of Austria, and wife of Charles, Duke of Calabria
 Catherine of Austria, Lady of Coucy (1320–1349), daughter of Leopold I, Duke of Austria, and wife of Enguerrand VI, Lord of Coucy
 Catherine of Austria (1420–1493), daughter of Ernest, Duke of Austria, and wife of Charles I, Margrave of Baden-Baden
 Catherine of Austria, Queen of Portugal (1507–1578), daughter of Philip I and Joanna of Castile, wife of King John III of Portugal
 Catherine of Austria, Queen of Poland (1533–1572), daughter of Ferdinand I, Holy Roman Emperor, and wife of King Sigismund II Augustus of Poland
 Infanta Catherine Michelle of Spain (1567–1597), daughter of Philip II of Spain and wife of Charles Emmanuel I, Duke of Savoy
 Archduchess Catherine Renata of Austria (1576–1599), daughter of Charles II, Archduke of Austria

See also
 Catherine of Bohemia (1342–1395), wife of Rudolf IV, Duke of Austria
 Catherine of Saxony, Archduchess of Austria (1468–1524), wife of Sigismund, Archduke of Austria